David Nathan Robins (17 November 1944 – 6 October 2007) was a British journalist, author, and sociologist who was closely associated with the 1960s and 70s counter-culture. Later he became involved in youth work and write several books on youth culture in Britain.

Early life and family
Robins was born on 17 November 1944. He was brought up in Willesden, north London. His father was a former boxer turned barber. His mother was a communist.  He was educated at Kilburn grammar school and then studied English at University College London. He married the Canadian art historian Anna Gruetzner Robins.

1960s counter-culture
In the mid 1960s, through a chance meeting with Barry Miles, Robins became an editor at the underground newspaper IT. He participated in the 1968 student rebellion in Paris and then became enthused with the situationists in London.

Youth work
In the 1970s, Robins became concerned that disaffected young people were moving towards far right causes and began to take a serious interest in them, beginning to write books on the subject and in the 1980s working with The Prince's Trust.

Death
Robins died on 6 October 2007. He was survived by his wife and his two children Daniel and Sophie.

Selected publications
Knuckle sandwich: Growing up in the working class city. Penguin, Harmondsworth, 1978. (with Philip Cohen) 
We hate humans. Penguin, Harmondsworth, 1984. 
Just punishment. Gloucester Press, London, 1990. 
Sport as prevention: The role of sport in crime prevention programmes aimed at young people: A report. Centre for Criminological Research, University of Oxford, Oxford, 1990. 
Tarnished vision: Crime and conflict in the inner city. Oxford University Press, Oxford, 1992.  
Cool rules: Anatomy of an attitude. Reaktion Books, 2000. (With Dick Pountain)

References 

1944 births
2007 deaths
British sociologists
People from Willesden
Alumni of University College London
20th-century British journalists